Microchrysa ghesquierei is a species of soldier fly in the family Stratiomyidae.

Distribution
Cameroun, Central African Republic, Congo, Ghana, Rwanda, Zimbabwe

References

Stratiomyidae
Insects described in 1938
Taxa named by Erwin Lindner
Diptera of Africa